Polypeptide N-acetylgalactosaminyltransferase 2 is an enzyme that in humans is encoded by the GALNT2 gene.

This gene encodes polypeptide N-acetylgalactosaminyltransferase 2, a member of the GalNAc-transferases family. This family transfers an N-acetyl galactosamine to the hydroxyl group of a serine or threonine residue in the first step of O-linked oligosaccharide biosynthesis. The localization site of this particular enzyme is preponderantly the trans-Golgi. Individual GalNAc-transferases have distinct activities, and initiation of O-glycosylation in a cell is regulated by a repertoire of GalNAc-transferases.

References

Further reading